Hoseynabad-e Mirza Momen (also Romanized as Ḩoseynābād-e Mīrzā Mo‘men; also known as Ḩoseynābād) is a village in Zarrin Rural District, Atamalek District, Jowayin County, Razavi Khorasan Province, Iran. At the 2006 census, its population was 614, in 160 families.

References 

Populated places in Joveyn County